Manuel Barange is a biologist. He is the director of the Fisheries and Aquaculture Policy and Resources Division at the Food and Agriculture Organization of the United Nations. He is an honorary professor at the University of Exeter. Barange was the Deputy Chief Executive Officer and Director of Science at the Plymouth Marine Laboratory and the chair of the scientific committee of the International Council for the Exploration of the Sea. From 2000-2010 he was the Director of the International Project Office of GLOBEC Global Ocean Ecosystem Dynamics, one of the first ever large programmes working on climate change and marine systems.

Dr Barange obtained his Bachelor of Science degree in Biology (majoring in Zoology and Ecology) in 1986 from the University of Barcelona, Spain. He conducted his PhD in Marine Ecology at the Sea Fisheries Research Institute (SFRI) in Cape Town, South Africa, awarded by the University of Barcelona as he wanted the late Prof Ramon Margalef to be the Chair of the award committee. He did post-doctoral research on Antarctic krill at the Sea Fisheries Research Institute, Cape Town, South Africa, where he remained a Specialist Scientist and Head of the Surveys and Fish Behaviour Division until 2000.

Awards and honors 
In 2010, Barange was awarded the Roger Revelle Medal by the Intergovernmental Oceanographic Commission. for his contributions to marine science. His colleague E. Macpherson named the New Caledonian decapod Munida Barangei in his honour. Members of the Macpherson team working on Namibian fisheries in the 1990s were equally honoured. He is a member of the Editorial Board of the African Journal of Marine Science.

References

External links 

 

Living people
20th-century biologists
21st-century biologists
Food and Agriculture Organization officials
Academics of the University of Exeter
Year of birth missing (living people)